Giannis Stamatiou (born 9 July 1962) is a Greek alpine skier. He competed at the 1980, 1984 and the 1988 Winter Olympics.

References

1962 births
Living people
Greek male alpine skiers
Olympic alpine skiers of Greece
Alpine skiers at the 1980 Winter Olympics
Alpine skiers at the 1984 Winter Olympics
Alpine skiers at the 1988 Winter Olympics
Sportspeople from Athens